Melbourne Victory FC AWT is an Afghan Australian women's soccer team affiliated with Melbourne Victory FC and Football Federation Victoria. Founded in March 2022, the club plays in the FFV State League 4 West, which is the seventh tier of football in the country.

History
In August 2021, following the takeover of Afghanistan by the Taliban, former national team captain Khalida Popal who was based in Denmark, urged players to delete their social media accounts, erase public identities and burn their kits for safety's sake as they are again under Taliban rule. On 25 August, the Australian government announced they had evacuated 75 Afghan women athletes including football players. FIFPro and Popal worked with authorities in six countries, including Australia, the US, and the UK, to get athletes and their families airlifted out of Afghanistan. FIFPro general secretary Jonas Baer-Hoffmann described the evacuations as "an incredibly complex process".

Establishment
The Afghanistan women's national team were able to regroup in Australia by early 2022. They secured a partnership with A-League club Melbourne Victory enabling the team to continue operating and train at the Darebin International Sports Centre. It is unclear if they would be allowed by FIFA to play official international matches.

In March 2022, the national team was admitted into Football Victoria's state league. They were placed in State League 4 West, the seventh tier of Australian women's football and sixth in the Victorian structure.

Players

Current squad

References

External links

2022 establishments in Australia
Soccer in Victoria (Australia)
Women's soccer clubs in Australia
Melbourne Victory FC
AWT
AWT
AWT
Diaspora sports clubs in Australia
Arab-Australian culture
Sport in the City of Melbourne (LGA)